Dimitrios Pappos (16 October 1939 – 1 March 2014) was a Greek alpine skier. He competed at the 1964 Winter Olympics and the 1968 Winter Olympics.

References

1939 births
2014 deaths
Greek male alpine skiers
Olympic alpine skiers of Greece
Alpine skiers at the 1964 Winter Olympics
Alpine skiers at the 1968 Winter Olympics
Sportspeople from Eastern Macedonia and Thrace